The Uniform Congressional District Act is a redistricting bill that requires that all members of the United States House of Representatives in the 91st United States Congress and every subsequent Congress be elected from a single member constituency unless a state had elected all of its previous representatives at large, where this requirement commenced during the 92nd United States Congress.

Historical context

Since 1929
Since the Supreme Court of the United States ruled in  that the previous requirements contained within the Apportionment Act of 1911 in relation to congressional districting and the manner of how representatives were to be elected were no longer in force since the enactment of the Reapportionment Act of 1929, there were no requirements imposed upon the states by Congress as to how representatives were to be elected to the United States House of Representatives. The Reapportionment Act of 1929 did not contain any requirements on how representatives were to be elected, including any requirements on how districts were to be drawn (if the state legislature chose to use districts), due to the presumption by Congress that the requirements enacted by the Apportionment Act of 1911 were still in force since Congress never repealed those requirements. Due to Wood, Missouri (13 seats), Kentucky (9), Virginia (9), Minnesota (9), and North Dakota (2), all elected their representatives at large while Texas elected 3 of their 21 seats at large; New York, Illinois, and Ohio each elected 2 of their seats at large; and Oklahoma, Connecticut, and Florida each elected 1 of their seats at large in the 1932 United States House of Representatives elections. All the states that elected some of their representatives at large (except Illinois) had gained seats from reapportionment but continued to use their previous congressional district boundaries while electing their new representatives at large. Arizona would continue to elect their representatives at large until 1946, even after gaining a second seat in 1943, and New Mexico and Hawaii would continue to elect all their representatives at large from their admission into the union until 1968 and 1970 respectively. Alabama also elected all eight of its representatives at large in 1962. Meanwhile, those states that elected representatives from single-member districts often elected representatives from districts that were not compact, contiguous, or roughly equal in population.

Colegrove era
In 1946, the Supreme Court of the United States ruled in a 4-3 decision Colegrove v. Green that the federal courts do not have jurisdiction to interfere with malapportioned congressional districts, with Congress having the sole authority to interfere with the same. For the next fifteen years, both congressional districts and state legislative districts would often have large population imbalances. The imbalance in the population of different congressional districts could have been fixed by an act of Congress but Congress failed to enact any standards and requirements concerning congressional districts and elections. Due to congressional inaction and new justices on the Supreme Court, the courts intervened in 1962 in the case Baker v. Carr which required that all state legislative districts be of roughly equal population. The court used the Fourteenth Amendment to the United States Constitution to justify its ruling (specifically the Equal Protection Clause). Wesberry v. Sanders extended Baker to the districts of the United States House of Representatives.

Legislative history
The act was enacted by Congress in 1967 primarily due to two reasons: the fear that the courts would force elections to be conducted at large if congressional districts were not compliant with federal jurisprudence or law and that southern states may have dissolved their districts so that racial minorities would not be able to elect representatives that are from a minority race, particularly after the enactment of the Voting Rights Act of 1965. In general, the requirement that all members of the House of Representatives be elected from single-member districts was widely supported by Congress, with Representative Gerald Ford stating, "I happen to feel that at-large elections are completely the wrong way for the election of Members of this body." The only real contention to this bill was whether there should be an exemption for Hawaii and New Mexico since they had always elected their representatives at large, with Senator Daniel Inouye of Hawaii stating that "because of geographical reasons, it is not very simple to district the State of Hawaii With the adoption of the amendment, an orderly transition will be possible for our State," along with Senator Clinton Anderson of New Mexico arguing that his state "has not been redistricted and it would cause a lot of trouble at this late hour to redistrict." However, there were members of Congress opposed to this exemption, with Senator Roman Hruska of Nebraska arguing that "The proposal before us will apply to every State in the Union except two. That is not good legislation. It certainly is not good principle," while Senator Gordon Allott of Colorado was opposed due to selfish reasons, arguing that "If under a decree of court one State could be required to be redistricted, there is no excuse for one State, two States, or 20 States to be excepted from that which others had to do."

Due to the widespread support of the members of Congress that there was a pressing need to ban elections at large, both the House and the Senate passed the bill with a voice vote, although the bill did allow for Hawaii and New Mexico to elect their representatives from single-member districts two years later than all other states due to their need to draw congressional districts for the first time in their histories.

Impact
Due to this act, elections to the House of Representatives are very similar to elections to the House of Commons of Canada and the House of Commons of the United Kingdom, except that United States congressional districts are far larger in terms of population than constituencies of the Houses of Commons. Because there are, almost always, only two major parties on the ticket for an election to Congress in the United States, Congressional districts are more representative than districts in Canada or the United Kingdom since the winning candidate in the United States typically wins by a majority or close to a majority while those countries that regularly have more than two candidates on the ballot typically win only by a plurality due to all three of these countries employing first-past-the-post electoral rules. On the other hand, districts in the United States are inherently less representative than those in other countries that employ mixed-member proportional representation such as Germany or New Zealand since each district in the United States only has one winner, therefore making competitive districts in particular less representative than safe districts since close to half of all votes in a competitive race go to a losing candidate, therefore leaving those voters without representation, while in multi-member proportional districts the proportion of the vote won by a political party results in them winning the same or similar proportion of seats in a multi-member district, especially when overhang seats and leveling seats are part of the electoral system.

See also
Representation of the People Act 1884
Redistribution of Seats Act 1885
Representation of the People Act 1948
Royal Assent by Commission Act 1541, an example of an act that contains two unrelated or distantly related subjects within the same act.

Notes

References

90th United States Congress